Seth, in Judaism, Christianity, Islam, Mandaeism, and Sethianism, was the third son of Adam and Eve and brother of Cain and Abel, their only other child mentioned by name in the Hebrew Bible.

Genesis
According to the Book of Genesis, Seth was born when Adam was 130 years old (according to the Masoretic Text), or 230 years old (according to the Septuagint), "a son in his likeness and image". According to Genesis, Seth died at the age of 912 (that is, 14 years before Noah's birth). (2962 BC)

Jewish tradition
Seth figures in the pseudepigraphical texts of the Life of Adam and Eve (the Apocalypse of Moses). It recounts the lives of Adam and Eve from after their expulsion from the Garden of Eden to their deaths. While the surviving versions were composed from the early third to the fifth century, the literary units in the work are considered to be older and predominantly of Jewish origin. There is wide agreement that the original was composed in a Semitic language in the first century AD/CE. In the Greek versions, Seth and Eve travel to the doors of the Garden to beg for some oil of the Tree of Mercy (i.e. the Tree of Life). On the way, Seth is attacked and bitten by a wild beast, which goes away when ordered by Seth. Michael refuses to give them the oil at that time, but promises to give it at the end of time, when all flesh will be raised up, the delights of paradise will be given to the holy people and God will be in their midst. On their return, Adam says to Eve: "What hast thou done? Thou hast brought upon us great wrath which is death." (chapters 5–14) Later, only Seth can witness the taking-up of Adam at his funeral in a divine chariot, which deposits him in the Garden of Eden.

Genesis refers to Seth as the ancestor of Noah and hence the father of all mankind, all other humans having perished in the Great Flood. Seth is seen by Eve as a replacement given by God for Abel, whom Cain had slain. It is said that late in life, Adam gave Seth secret teachings that would become the Kabbalah. The Zohar refers to Seth as "ancestor of all the generations of the tzaddikim" (Hebrew: righteous ones). According to Seder Olam Rabbah, based on Jewish reckoning, he was born in 130 AM. According to Aggadah, he had 33 sons and 23 daughters. According to the Seder Olam Rabbah, he died in 1042 AM.

Josephus
In the Antiquities of the Jews, Josephus refers to Seth as virtuous and of excellent character, and reports that his descendants invented the wisdom of the heavenly bodies, and built the "pillars of the sons of Seth", two pillars inscribed with many scientific discoveries and inventions, notably in astronomy. They were built by Seth's descendants based on Adam's prediction that the world would be destroyed at one time by fire and another time by global flood, in order to protect the discoveries and be remembered after the destruction. One was composed of brick, and the other of stone, so that if the pillar of brick should be destroyed, the pillar of stone would remain, both reporting the ancient discoveries, and informing men that a pillar of brick was also erected. Josephus reports that the pillar of stone remained in the land of Siriad in his day.

William Whiston, a 17/18th-century translator of the Antiquities, stated in a footnote that he believed Josephus mistook Seth for Sesostris, king of Egypt, the erector of the pillar in Siriad (being a contemporary name for the territories in which Sirius was venerated, i.e. Egypt). He stated that there was no way for any pillars of Seth to survive the deluge, because the deluge buried all such pillars and edifices far underground in the sediment of its waters. The perennialist writer Nigel Jackson identifies the land of Siriad in Josephus' account with Syria, citing related Mandaean legends regarding the "Oriental Land of Shyr" in connection with the visionary mytho-geography of the prophetic traditions surrounding Seth.

Christianity
The second-century BC Book of Jubilees, regarded as noncanonical except in the Alexandrian Churches, also dates his birth to 130 AM. According to it, in 231 AM Seth married his sister, Azura, who was four years younger than he was. In the year 235 AM, Azura gave birth to Enos.

Seth is commemorated as one of the Holy Forefathers in the Calendar of Saints of the Armenian Apostolic Church, along with Adam, Abel, and others, with a feast day on July 26. He is also included in the Genealogy of Jesus, according to Luke 3:23–38.

The Sethians were a Christian Gnostic sect who may date their existence to before Christianity. Their thinking, although it is predominantly Judaic in foundation, is arguably strongly influenced by Platonism. Sethians are so called for their veneration of the biblical Seth, who is depicted in their creation myths as a divine incarnation; consequently, the offspring or 'posterity' of Seth are held to comprise a superior elect within human society.

Islam 

Although the Quran makes no mention of Shīth ibn Ādam, he is revered within Islamic tradition as the third and righteous son of Adam and Eve and seen as the gift bestowed on Adam after the death of Abel. The Sunni scholar and historian ibn Kathir in his tarikh (book of history), Al-Bidāya wa-n-nihāya, records that Seth, a prophet like his father Adam, transfers God's Law to mankind after the death of Adam, and places him among the exalted antediluvian patriarchs of the Generations of Adam. Some sources say that Seth was the receiver of scriptures. These scriptures are said to be the "first scriptures" mentioned in the Quran 87:18. Medieval historian and exegete al-Tabari and other scholars say that Seth buried Adam and the secret texts in the tomb of Adam, i.e., the "Cave of Treasures".

The Islamic literature holds that Seth was born when Adam was past 100 and that Adam appointed Seth as guide to his people. The 11th-century Syrian historian and translator Al-Mubashshir ibn Fātik recorded the maxims and aphorisms of the ancient philosophers in his book Kitāb mukhtār al-ḥikam wa-maḥāsin al-kalim and included a chapter on Seth. Within Islamic tradition Seth holds wisdom of several kinds; knowledge of time, prophecy of the future Great Flood, and inspiration on the methods of night prayer. Islam, Judaism and Christianity trace the genealogy of mankind back to Seth since Abel left no heirs and Cain's heirs, according to tradition, were destroyed by the Great Flood. Many traditional Islamic crafts are traced back to Seth, such as the making of horn combs. Seth also plays a role in Sufism, and Ibn Arabi includes a chapter in his Bezels of Wisdom on Seth, entitled "The Wisdom of Expiration in the Word of Seth".

Some traditions locate Seth's tomb in the village of Al-Nabi Shayth ( "The Prophet Seth") in the mountains above the Beqaa Valley in Lebanon, where there is a mosque named after him. This tomb was described by the 12th-century geographer Ibn Jubayr. A rival tradition, mentioned by later medieval Arab geographers from the 13th century on, placed the tomb of Nabi Shith ("Prophet Seth") in the Palestinian village of Bashshit, southwest of Ramla village. According to the Palestine Exploration Fund, Bashshit means Beit Shith, i.e. "House of Seth". The village was depopulated with the establishment of the State of Israel in 1948, but the three-domed structure said to be Seth's tomb survives in the Israeli moshav Aseret built on the site. Another tomb in the city of Balkh Afghanistan has been identified as the burial sight of Seth sheth

Local Muslims in Ayodhya, Uttar Pradesh in India believe a  grave in Hazrat Shees Jinnati Mosque to be of Hazrat Shees or the Prophet Seth.

Mandaeism

According to the Mandaean scriptures, including the Qolastā, the Book of John and Genzā Rabbā, Seth is cognate with the angelic soteriological figure Sheetil (also spelled Shitil), a son of Adam Kadmaya who taught John the Baptist with his brothers Anush (Enosh) and Hibil Ziwa (Abel). He is variously spoken of as a son of Adam, a brother or son of Hibil, and the brother or father of Anush. Sheetil is one of the revealers of Mandaeism and a prophet, identified as the biblical Seth.

Yazidism

In Yazidism, Seth is known as Shehid ibn Jerr.

According to Yazidi oral literature, Adam and Eve each deposited their seeds into separate jars. While Eve's seed developed into insects, Adam's seed gave birth to Shehid ibn Jerr, the ancestor of the Yazidis. Yazidis thus believe that they have been created separately and differently from all other human beings (Kreyenbroek 2005: 31).

Family tree

Shrines

Iraq
On July 26, 2014, forces of the Islamic State of Iraq and the Levant (ISIL) blew up Nabi Shiyt (Prophet Seth) shrine in Mosul, Iraq. Sami al-Massoudi, the deputy head of the Shiite Endowment Office overseeing holy sites, confirmed that destruction. He added, ISIL took some of the artifacts to an unknown location.

Lebanon

There is a village named after him in Lebanon, that is Al-Nabi Shayth or Al-Nabi Sheeth (meaning "The Prophet Seth"), which is also considered to contain his shrine.

Israel

The tomb of Bashshit is believed to be the grave of Seth. The tomb now sits in Aseret.

See also

 Set (deity) or Seth, an Egyptian deity
 Seth (disambiguation)
 Suteans

Notes

References

 
Bereshit (parashah)
Christian saints from the Old Testament
Children of Adam and Eve
Book of Jubilees
Uthras